Georges River College may refer to:

 Georges River College (Hurstville Boys Campus)
 Georges River College (Peakhurst Campus)
 Georges River College (Penshurst Girls Campus)

See also 
 Georges River
 George River (disambiguation)